Can't Slow Down may refer to:

 Can't Slow Down (Lionel Richie album) or its title song, 1983
 Can't Slow Down (Saves the Day album), 1998
 Can't Slow Down (Foreigner album), 2009
 "Can't Slow Down" (song), by Hedley from their album Hello, 2015
 "Can't Slow Down", by Joe Satriani from his album Flying in a Blue Dream, 1989